Gayane Abrahamyan (born 2 July 1979) is an Armenian politician and journalist who served in the National Assembly.

Early life

Gayane Abrahamyan was born on 2 July 1979. She graduated from the Yerevan State Academy of Fine Arts in 2007, and from the International Center for Journalists in 2009.

Career

Journalism

From 1997 to 2001, Abrahamyan served as the coordinator of the Little Singers of Armenia. She worked as a journalist for Armenia Now and Armenian International Magazine, as an Armenian correspondent for International Eurasianet, and as a correspondent with The Guardian and One Magazine.

Politics

On 9 December 2018, she was elected as a member of the National Assembly as a member of the My Step Alliance. During her tenure in the National Assembly she served on the Standing Committee on European Integration committee. She also served as the head of Armenia's delegation to the Euronest Parliamentary Assembly after Mkhitar Hayrapetyan stepped down as head of the delegation and as co-president of the organization. Abrahamyan resigned on September 25, 2020.

References

1979 births
21st-century Armenian politicians
21st-century Armenian women politicians
Living people
Members of the 7th convocation of the National Assembly (Armenia)